Vasculogenesis is the process of blood vessel formation, occurring by a de novo production of endothelial cells. It is sometimes paired with angiogenesis, as the first stage of the formation of the vascular network, closely followed by angiogenesis.

Process
In the sense distinguished from angiogenesis, vasculogenesis is different in one aspect: whereas angiogenesis is the formation of new blood vessels from pre-existing ones, vasculogenesis is the formation of new blood vessels, in blood islands, when there are no pre-existing ones. For example, if a monolayer of endothelial cells begins sprouting to form capillaries, angiogenesis is occurring. Vasculogenesis, in contrast, is when endothelial precursor cells (angioblasts) migrate and differentiate in response to local cues (such as growth factors and extracellular matrices) to form new blood vessels. These vascular trees are then pruned and extended through angiogenesis.

Occurrences

Vasculogenesis occurs during embryologic development of the circulatory system. Specifically, around blood islands, which first arise in the mesoderm of the yolk sac at 3 weeks of development.

Vasculogenesis can also occur in the adult organism from circulating endothelial progenitor cells (derivatives of stem cells) able to contribute, albeit to varying degrees, to neovascularization. Examples of where vasculogenesis can occur in adults are:
 Tumor growth (see HP59)
 Revascularization or neovascularization after trauma, for example, after cardiac ischemia or retinal ischemia
 Endometriosis - It appears that up to 37% of the microvascular endothelium of the ectopic endometrial tissue originates from endothelial progenitor cells.

See also 
 Vascular remodelling in the embryo
 Vasculogenic mimicry

References

Embryology of cardiovascular system
Cardiovascular physiology